Linkage (styled as LINKAGE) is the third album by J-pop singer Mami Kawada. It was released on March 24, 2010 under Geneon Universal Entertainment. This album contains thirteen tracks which includes her singles "PSI-Missing", "Masterpiece" and "Prophecy". This album also contains the ending theme for the original video animation anime series Shakugan no Shana S entitled "All In Good Time" and a cover song of The Cranberries' hit song entitled "Dreams".

This album came in a limited CD+DVD edition  (GNCV-1017) and a regular CD-only edition (GNCV-1018). The DVD contains the music video for the title track "Linkage".

Track listing
succession—0:56
Composition: Tomoyuki Nakazawa
Arrangement: Tomoyuki Nakazawa, Takeshi Ozaki
CLIMAX—4:05
Composition: Tomoyuki Nakazawa
Arrangement: Tomoyuki Nakazawa, Takeshi Ozaki
PSI-missing—4:21
Lyrics: Mami Kawada
Composition: Tomoyuki Nakazawa
Arrangement: Tomoyuki Nakazawa, Takeshi Ozaki
TOY—4:10
Lyrics: Mami Kawada
Composition/Arrangement: Maiko Iuchi
—5:00
Lyrics: Mami Kawada
Composition: Kazuya Takase
Arrangement: Mai Nakazaki
Prophecy—4:50
Lyrics: Mami Kawada
Composition/Arrangement: Tomoyuki Nakazawa, Takeshi Ozaki
in answer—4:52
Lyrics: Mami Kawada
Composition/Arrangement: C.G mix
masterpiece—4:37
Lyrics: Mami Kawada
Composition/Arrangement: Maiko Iuchi
—5:24
Lyrics: Mami Kawada
Composition/Arrangement: Kazuya Takase
linkage—4:26
Lyrics: Mami Kawada
Composition: Tomoyuki Nakazawa
Arrangement: Tomoyuki Nakazawa, Takeshi Ozaki
—5:30
Lyrics: Mami Kawada
Composition/Arrangement: Maiko Iuchi
All in good time—5:06
Lyrics: Mami Kawada
Composition/Arrangement: Tomoyuki Nakazawa, Takeshi Ozaki
Dreams—4:43
Lyrics: Dolores O'Riordan, Noel Hogan

Sales trajectory

References

2010 albums
Mami Kawada albums